Coniothyrium celtidis-australis is a species of fungus in the family Leptosphaeriaceae.

References 

Fungi described in 1884
Fungal plant pathogens and diseases
Pleosporales